Rūsiņš Mārtiņš Freivalds (10 November 1942 – 4 January 2016) was a Latvian computer scientist and mathematician. He was a member of the Latvian Academy of Sciences from 1992. He discovered Freivalds' algorithm for checking the correctness of matrix products. He also taught at the University of Latvia, with students including Daina Taimiņa and Andris Ambainis. He was born in Cesvaine and studied at Moscow State University (MSU).

Freivalds died from a heart attack on 4 January 2016 in Riga, aged 73.

References

1942 births
2016 deaths
Academicians of the Latvian Academy of Sciences
Latvian computer scientists
Latvian educators
20th-century Latvian mathematicians
Moscow State University alumni
People from Cesvaine
University of Latvia alumni
Academic staff of the University of Latvia
Theoretical computer scientists
Soviet mathematicians
Soviet computer scientists
Soviet educators
21st-century Latvian mathematicians